The 2016 Giro del Trentino was a road cycling stage race that took place in the Trentino region of northern Italy between 19 and 22 April 2016. It was the 40th edition of the Giro del Trentino and was rated as a 2.HC event as part of the 2016 UCI Europe Tour.

The race included four stages. The first was a  team time trial. The remaining stages were all mountainous, with Stage 2 ending with a summit finish in Anras. The previous year's champion, 's Richie Porte, chose not to compete. The principal favourites for victory were Mikel Landa (Team Sky), Romain Bardet and Domenico Pozzovivo (both ) and Vincenzo Nibali.

After  won the opening team time trial, Landa won the second stage with its summit finish. The last two stages were both won by Astana's Tanel Kangert. Despite the bonus seconds won by Kangert, Landa won the general classification by two seconds. Kangert's teammate Jakob Fuglsang was third, 14 seconds behind Landa.

Route

Teams 

Eighteen teams will take part in the race. Three of these are UCI WorldTeams; eight are UCI Professional Continental teams; six are UCI Continental teams; one is an Italian national team.

Stages

Stage 1 

19 April 2016, Riva to Torbole,  (TTT)

Stage 2 

20 April 2016, Arco to Anras,

Stage 3 

21 April 2016, Sillian to Mezzolombardo,

Stage 4 

22 April, Malè to Cles,

Classifications

References

External links 

 

2016
Giro del Trentino
Giro del Trentino